Uģis Lasmanis (born 29 July 1967) is a Latvian rower. He competed at the 1992 Summer Olympics and the 1996 Summer Olympics.

References

1967 births
Living people
Latvian male rowers
Olympic rowers of Latvia
Rowers at the 1992 Summer Olympics
Rowers at the 1996 Summer Olympics
People from Ventspils